Herbert Donovan Michael (13 August 1890 – 27 April 1956) was an Australian politician who represented the South Australian House of Assembly seat of Light from 1939 to 1941 and 1944 to 1956 for the Liberal and Country League.

He was previously the chairman of the District Council of Eudunda from 1933 to 1941.

Michael attended Kyre College, the predecessor to Scotch College, Adelaide.

References

 

1890 births
1956 deaths
Members of the South Australian House of Assembly
Liberal and Country League politicians
20th-century Australian politicians
Mayors of places in South Australia